The 1986 British Open was a professional ranking snooker tournament, that was held from 16 February to 2 March 1986 with television coverage beginning on 21 February at the Assembly Rooms in Derby, England.
 


Main draw

The Last 64 was played at Solihull on 4 and 5 December 1985. The last 32 onwards was played at Derby.

Final

References

British Open (snooker)
British Open
British Open
British Open
British Open